Radim Nyč (born 11 April 1966, in Liberec) is a former Czech cross-country skier who raced from 1988 to 1994. He earned a bronze medal in the 4 × 10 km relay at the 1988 Winter Olympics in Calgary while his best individual Winter Olympics finish was a sixth in the 50 km event in 1992.

Nyč also won a bronze medal in the 4 × 10 km relay at the 1989 FIS Nordic World Ski Championships. His best individual finish at the World Championships was a 13th in the 15 km event at those same championships.

Nyč's best career World Cup finish was sixth in 1991 in Canada.

Cross-country skiing results
All results are sourced from the International Ski Federation (FIS).

Olympic Games
 1 medal – (1 bronze)

World Championships
 1 medal – (1 bronze)

World Cup

Season standings

Team podiums
 3 podiums – (3 ) 
{| class="wikitable sortable" style="font-size:95%; text-align:center; border:grey solid 1px; border-collapse:collapse; background:#ffffff;"
|- style="background:#efefef;"
! style="background-color:#369; color:white;"| No.
! style="background-color:#369; color:white;"| Season
! style="background-color:#4180be; color:white; width:120px;"| Date
! style="background-color:#4180be; color:white; width:170px;"| Location
! style="background-color:#4180be; color:white; width:170px;"| Race
! style="background-color:#4180be; color:white; width:130px;"| Level
! style="background-color:#4180be; color:white;| Place
! style="background-color:#4180be; color:white;"| Teammates
|-
| align=center|1 || rowspan=1 align=center|1987–88||  4 February 1988 || align=left|   Calgary, Canada ||  4 × 10 km Relay F || Olympic Games ||3rd || Korunka / Benc / Švanda
|-
| align=center|2 || rowspan=1 align=center|1988–89|| 24 February 1989 || align=left|   Lahti, Finland || 4 × 10 km Relay C/F || World Championships  ||3rd || Švanda / Petrásek / Korunka
|-
| align=center|3|| rowspan=1 align=center|1989–90||11 March 1990 || align=left|   Örnsköldsvik, Sweden  || 4 × 10 km Relay C/F || World Cup || 3rd || Buchta / Švanda / Korunka
|-
|}Note:'''  Until the 1999 World Championships and the 1994 Winter Olympics, World Championship and Olympic races were included in the World Cup scoring system.

References

External links
 
 
 

1966 births
Living people
Czech male cross-country skiers
Czechoslovak male cross-country skiers
Cross-country skiers at the 1988 Winter Olympics
Cross-country skiers at the 1992 Winter Olympics
Olympic cross-country skiers of Czechoslovakia
Olympic bronze medalists for Czechoslovakia
Olympic medalists in cross-country skiing
FIS Nordic World Ski Championships medalists in cross-country skiing
Medalists at the 1988 Winter Olympics
Sportspeople from Liberec